Walter Lee Harrison is an American university administrator,  currently president emeritus of the University of Hartford, in West Hartford, Connecticut. Harrison currently sits on the board of trustees for Trinity College in Hartford, Connecticut.

A native of Pittsburgh, Harrison graduated from Trinity College in 1968 and earned a master's degree from the University of Michigan in 1969.  He subsequently served as a captain in the United States Air Force before earning his doctorate from the University of California, Davis.

Career
Harrison began his career as an educator, teaching English and American Studies at Johannes Gutenberg University of Mainz in Mainz, Germany, Iowa State University and Colorado College.

Following his educational career, Harrison left full-time teaching to take an administrative position at Colorado College. He joined Gehrung Associates University Relations Counselors in 1985, where he worked with such clients as the Kellogg School of Management at Northwestern University, Bryn Mawr College, Smith College and Williams College. He became president of the firm shortly thereafter. In 1989 Harrison moved to the University of Michigan, where he became vice president of university relations and secretary of the university.

University of Hartford
Harrison became the fifth president of the University of Hartford in 1998. During Harrison's tenure, the university has undertaken a vigorous and comprehensive building campaign in an attempt to modify the archaic and outdated structures, most of which were built in the 1960s. Building projects completed under Harrsion's presidency included the Hartford Arts school's visual arts complex, ISET science complex, Mort and Irma Performing Arts Center, and Shaw Center at Hillyer College. Harrison taught one English course per year at Hartford, where, in addition to being the university's president, he held the rank of resident professor. On June 30, 2017 Harrison retired from the University of Hartford.   After the renovation of its libraries in 2016, the university announced that they would now be named the Harrison University Libraries.

Awards and honors
Harrison chairs the National Collegiate Athletic Association's Committee on Academic Performance. In 2015 Harrison was named to the Knight Commission on Intercollegiate Athletics, which works to promote a reform agenda that emphasizes the educational mission of college sports. In 2017 the America East Conference renamed its academic cup to the Walter Harrison Academic Cup. The cup is presented to the institution whose student-athletes post the highest grade-point average during that academic year.

References

External links 
 Official biography, Trinity College

Presidents of the University of Hartford
Iowa State University faculty
University of Michigan alumni
Trinity College (Connecticut) alumni
University of California, Davis alumni
University of Michigan faculty
Living people
1946 births